The 2012-13 NBL Indonesia is the third season of NBL Indonesia, a nationwide basketball competition which previously known as Indonesian Basketball League (IBL).

Participating teams
 Satya Wacana Angsapura
 Dell Aspac Jakarta
 Stadium Jakarta
 Bima Sakti Malang
 CLS Knights
 Garuda Kukar Bandung
 Muba Hang Tuah
 Pelita Jaya Energi-MP Jakarta
 SM BritAma
 Tonga BSC
 NSH GMC Riau
 Pacific Caesar

Competition format
Participating teams compete in the regular season using home tournament format. The regular season divided into 5 series, each with different host cities. The top teams in final overall standings will continue to the championship playoffs.

There is also a pre-season warm-up tournament held before the regular season.

Regular season

Standings

Updated to games played on 13 February 2013.

Statistics leaders

Individual statistic leaders

Awards
Most Valuable Player: Pringgo Regowo, Dell Aspac 
Defensive Player of the Year: Galank Gunawan, Satria Muda BritAma
Rookie of the Year: Andakara Prastawa, Dell Aspac
Sixth Man of the Year: Andakara Prastawa, Dell Aspac
Coach of the Year: Rastapani Horongbala, Dell Aspac
Sportsmanship Award: Max Yanto, NSH GMC Riau

All-NBL First Team:
 F Pringgo Regowo, Dell Aspac
 F Bima Rizky Ardiansyah, Bima Sakti Nikko Steel
 C Rony Gunawan, Satria Muda BritAma
 G Andakara Prastawa, Dell Aspac
 G Dimas Aryo Dewanto, Pelita Jaya

Postseason

The championship series began on Saturday May 18, 2013, and concludes with the 2013 NBL Indonesia Finals, which began on May 26 between the Dell Aspac Jakarta and the Pelita Jaya Energi-MP Jakarta

Bracket
All matches were played in GOR UNY in Universitas Negeri Yogyakarta, Yogyakarta.

Game Info

Quarterfinals

Preliminary round

Semifinals

Elimination round

Preliminary finals

Battle of Third

Final

References

2012-13
2012–13 in Asian basketball leagues
NBL